Sedan Township is a township in Chautauqua County, Kansas, USA. As of the 2000 census, its population was 1,660.

Geography
The streams of Deer Creek, Fly Creek and Wolf Creek run through this township. According to the United States Geological Survey, it contains two cemeteries: Casement and Greenwood.

Transportation
Sedan Township contains one airport, Sedan City Airport.

References
 USGS Geographic Names Information System (GNIS)

External links
 US-Counties.com
 City-Data.com

Townships in Chautauqua County, Kansas
Townships in Kansas